Francesca LaMonte (1895–1982) was a noted ichthyologist and a founding figure of the International Game Fish Association. She worked as an Assistant Curator at the American Museum of Natural History from 1920 to 1962. She began working with the museum two years after graduating from Wellesley College by translating scientific articles to English from French, German, Spanish, Italian, and Russian. LaMonte conducted significant field work, specializing in big game fish such as marlins and swordfish. She authored numerous scientific papers and best-selling fishing guides with vivid descriptors. Her years of science writing gained her the respect of prominent literary figures, including Ernest Hemingway, whom she advised on fish anatomical descriptions. The genus of the South American armored catfish (Lamontichthys) is named after her, immortalizing her contributions to fish conservation.

Works 
 LaMonte, F. (1945). North American Game Fishes. Garden City, NY: Doubleday, Doran & Co

See also
:Category:Taxa named by Francesca LaMonte

References 

 https://igfa.org/history-francesca-lamonte

Further reading
Contemporary news article

People associated with the American Museum of Natural History
American ichthyologists
Women ichthyologists
1895 births
1982 deaths
20th-century American zoologists